Equinunk may refer to:

In Pennsylvania:
Equinunk, Pennsylvania, a community in Wayne County
Equinunk Creek, a tributary of the Delaware River
Equinunk Historic District
Camp Equinunk, in Honesdale

See also